William Robson may refer to:

Politicians
William Robson (1869–1951), Australian parliamentarian and businessman
William Robson (1843–1920), Australian politician
William Robson, Baron Robson (1852–1918), British Member of Parliament, law officer, and law lord
William Robson (Canadian politician) (1864–1941), Canadian politician

Other people
William B. P. Robson (born 1959), President and CEO of the C.D. Howe Institute
William N. Robson (1906–1995), American radio director and producer
William Robson (writer) (1785/6–1863), British author and translator
William Robson (footballer) (fl. 1895), English football centre forward
William Robson (cricketer) (born 1946), English cricketer
William Wallace Robson (1923–1993), British literary critic and scholar
William A. Robson (1895–1980), Professor of public administrative law at London University and co-founder of the Political Quarterly